Thomas Fry may refer to:

 Thomas Fry (priest, born 1718) (1718–1772), English priest and academic
 Thomas Fry (priest, born 1775) (1775–1860), English cleric and academic
 Thomas Fry (priest, born 1846) (1846–1930), English Anglican clergyman, Dean of Lincoln

See also 
 Thomas Frye (disambiguation)